Sissy is a 2022 Australian independent horror-thriller film written and directed by Hannah Barlow and Kane Senes and starring Aisha Dee in the title role.

Plot  
Young best friends Cecilia and Emma make a pact to be friends forever. Years later, an adult Cecilia is a successful lifestyle vlogger. While shopping at a pharmacy, she reunites with Emma, who calls Cecilia "Sissy" to the other’s chagrin. After exchanging contact information, Emma invites Cecilia to her engagement party, and later to her bachelorette party.

Cecilia arrives at Emma and her fiancé Fran's house for the bachelorette party, and meets Emma's friends Tracey and Jamie. During the trip, Fran mentions that a girl named Alex, Cecilia's former grade school bully, is joining them. The car accidentally hits a kangaroo, and when they all exit the car to inspect it, Cecilia is especially horrified, imagining the bloodied, spasming creature as a young Alex. Fran insists on running over the kangaroo's head to put it out of its misery. Once they arrive at their destination, Alex treats Cecilia coldly, including belittling her career as an influencer, while the other guests largely ignore her. Emma later apologizes to Cecilia for Alex's behavior and encourages them to make amends.

While at a lake the next day, Cecilia overhears Alex, Tracey, and Jamie badmouthing her. When Emma storms off angrily, all but Alex follow her. Alex asks Cecilia why she bothered showing up and steals her phone, which she uses to post a video on Cecilia's social media accounts, ostensibly "exposing" Cecilia’s true cruel, sadistic nature to her followers. While wrestling for the phone, Cecilia strikes Alex in the head with a rock, seemingly killing her. It is revealed that as a child, Alex had repetitively taunted Cecilia until the latter eventually struck Alex in the face with a gardening trowel, disfiguring her cheek. 

Cecilia drags Alex into the woods to bury her, stealing a necklace from the body beforehand. She then begins a livestream where she calmly attempts to lead her followers in meditation and replant an uprooted tree on top of Alex's grave. Jamie arrives and flees when he sees Alex's body, but Cecilia pushes him over a cliff to his death. Emma then falls into a river while searching for Alex.

Back at the house, Tracey reveals she knows what happened between Cecilia and Alex. Cecilia pushes Tracey into a bathtub and watches vacantly as the latter drowns when her hair gets tangled in the plug. Meanwhile, Alex, who is still alive, emerges from her grave, nearly blinded from a grievous head wound. Cecilia picks up Fran on the road while searching for Emma and confesses her heartbreak that they didn't grow old together, as they said they would when they were kids. Fran tries to calm her, but Cecilia accelerates and suddenly brakes, ejecting Fran from the windshield. Cecilia then runs over Fran's head to end her suffering as Fran had done to the kangaroo earlier.

Alex finds Emma's lost phone and manages to call the police, but cannot speak due to her head wound. The police trace the call before the phone dies. Cecilia arrives at the house and repeatedly beats herself in the face with her phone, then begins a livestream, begging her followers for help and claiming Alex attacked her and killed the others. Cecilia subsequently passes out and is awoken by Emma, to whom Cecilia relays the same story, but Emma realizes the truth when she finds Tracey's corpse hidden under the bed and notices Cecilia wearing Alex's necklace. Cecilia accidentally causes Emma to slip and knock herself out and ties her up with the intention of fixing their friendship when she regains consciousness but Emma frees herself and begins to fight back. She gains the upper hand, viciously beating Cecilia before Alex suddenly returns and, confusing Emma for Cecilia, bashes Emma's face in. Cecilia thanks Alex, and, upon realizing the error she's made, Alex is about to kill her before the police arrive and fatally shoot Alex, believing her to have been the instigator.

Some time later, now a famed survivor of the "Alex Kutis Massacre", Cecilia promotes a book she has written on her channel.

Cast  
 
 Aisha Dee  as Cecilia / Sissy 
 Hannah Barlow as	Emma
Emily De Margheriti as	Alex
Daniel Monks as	Jamie
Yerin Ha  as	Tracey
Lucy Barrett 	 as	Fran
 Shaun Martindale as Senior Constable Martindale
 Amelia Lule as Young Cecilia / Sissy
 Camille Cumpston as Young Emm
 April Blasdall as Young Alex 
 Melissa Brownlow as Pregnant Lady

Release
The film had its official premiere at the 2022 South by Southwest where it was the opening night film of the Midnighters program. It was distributed by the streaming service Shudder.

Reception
On Rotten Tomatoes, the film has an approval rating of 96% based on 72 reviews, with an average rating of 6.4/10. The website's critical consensus reads, "Sissy weaves timely themes into its rich blend of horror and dark humor, topped off by terrific work from a talented cast led by Aisha Dee."

In his review on The Guardian Luke Buckmaster praised the "Aisha Dee’s painfully good performance" as well as the satirical elements which added "perhaps unexpected level of depth to a film that is impressively unpredictable all the way to the bitter end". Jon Mendelsohn of CBR.com described the film as "Heathers by way of Texas Chainsaw Massacre with a modern twist - basically, a must-see film".

The film was nominated for three AACTA Awards, for best film, best direction and best lead actress (Aisha Dee).Jamie Dunkin of Gamurs Group dubbed it the best horror film of 2022, praising its social commentary and "cringe-inducing violence".

References

External links
  

2022 horror films
2022 thriller films 
2020s Australian films
Films about social media
Films about bullying
Australian slasher films
2020s slasher films